is a railway station on the Sōtetsu Shin-Yokohama Line and Tōkaidō Freight Line. It is located in Kanagawa-ku, Yokohama, Kanagawa Prefecture. This station is jointly operated by Sōtetsu (Sagami Railway), with station number SO51, and JR East.

History

Chronology 
 11 December 2017: Sōtetsu finalised the station name as Hazawa yokohama-kokudai Station. However, as of that time the route name was still provisional. The station's name comes from its locale, Hazawa (羽沢), and also its neighbouring university, the Yokohama National University, or in Japanese, Yokohama Kokudai (横浜国大).
 30 November 2019: Opening of the Sōtetsu JR Link Line.
 18 March 2023: Opening of the Sōtetsu Shin-Yokohama Line extension towards .

Station layout
The station consists of two underground side platforms. At the east side of the station, the tracks for the JR Link Line and the Tōkyū Link Line diverge, with the JR Link Line converging with the Tōkaidō Freight Line after leaving the junction.

Surrounding area
 JR Freight Yokohama-Hazawa Station (Freight Station of the Tōkaidō Freight Line)
 Daisan Keihin Road
 Hazawa Interchange
 Hodogaya Parking Area
 Hodogaya Toll Gate
 Sagawa Express North Yokohama Branch
 Yokohama National University Tokiwadai Campus
 Tokiwadai Hospital
 JCHO Yokohama Hodogaya Central Hospital

See also 
 List of railway stations in Japan

References 
This article incorporates material from the corresponding article in the Japanese Wikipedia.

External links

Stations of East Japan Railway Company
Stations of Sagami Railway
Railway stations in Yokohama
Railway stations in Japan opened in 2019